Kottappuram or Kasargod district, north Kerala, India, is a backwater destination, which is also known as "Valiyaparamba backwaters". Kottappuram is situated 40 km south of Kasaragod, a part of nileshwar municipality. Nearest town is Nileshwar

Tourism
Kottappuram is known for attractions which draw large numbers of visitors,   which include meandering rivers and tranquil beaches. The bridge across the river roughly marks its northern boundary. The rivers, Tejaswini and Nileswar, meet a short distance away before spilling jointly into the sea at Taikadappuram. The nearest beach is at Thaikandapuram. A small fishing is located close to the estuary.

Transportation
Local roads have access to NH.66 which connects to Mangalore in the north and Calicut in the south. The nearest railway station is Nileshwar on Mangalore-Palakkad line. There are airports at Mangalore and Calicut.

Geography of Kasaragod district